Bertrand Gallou (born 9 May 1974) is a French former professional footballer who played as a goalkeeper. Between 1994 and 1999, he played in Ligue 2 for FC Mulhouse.

References
 
 

1974 births
Living people
Sportspeople from Tours, France
French footballers
Association football goalkeepers
Tours FC players
FC Mulhouse players
Angoulême Charente FC players
Gap HAFC players
Ligue 2 players
Footballers from Centre-Val de Loire